Dolega (in Polish Dołęga) may refer to:

Places
Dolega, Chiriquí, Panama
Dołęga, Lesser Poland Voivodeship (south Poland)

People
Mycielski (Dołęga) (singular masculine), Mycielska (singular feminine), Mycielscy (plural), from a Polish noble family. The Hrabia (Count) Dołęga-Mycielscy were originally from the clan Dołęga in the Mazowieckie region of Poland.
Lucas Dolega (1978–2011), French/German photojournalist
Marcin Dołęga (born 1982), Polish weightlifter
Robert Dołęga (born 1977), Polish weightlifter
Tadeusz Dołęga-Mostowicz (1898–1939), Polish writer, journalist and author

Others
Dołęga coat of arms, a Polish coat of arms